Rita Brantalou, stage name of Jacques Pradel, (8 July 1948 – 21 July 2021) was a French humorist and musician.

Biography
After earning a bachelor's degree, Pradel began a career as a designer. He became a guitarist, singer, and bassist for the rock band Au Bonheur des Dames in 1974 and registered with the Société des auteurs, compositeurs et éditeurs de musique on 3 February 1975. He chose the pseudonym Ricky Brantalou, the first name of which was later changed to Rita.

He regularly portrayed the character Michou-Bidou and wrote a number of sketches.

Pradel first began writing plays in 1985 alongside his rock career. Throughout the 1990s, he was an actor in multiple series and films.

Rita Brantalou died on 21 July 2021 at the age of 73.

Discography

With Au Bonheur des Dames

Studio albums
 (1974)
 (1975)
 (1976)
 (1987)
Métal moumoute (2016)

Live Albums
Les adieux (live) (1997)

Compilations

Quart de touist (2007)

With Odeurs

Singles
Youpi la France! (1979)
L'homme objet / La viande de porc (1979)
Que c'est bon / L'amour (1981)
Chanson à la mode / Triple slow (1982)
Le cri du kangourou / Concours Lépine (1983)
Optimiste / Toujours moins toujours (1983)

Albums
Ramon Pipin's Odeurs (1979)
Optimiste : Enregistrement public (1979)
1980 : No Sex ! (1980)
De l'amour (1981)
Toujours plus haut (1983)

Compilations
Fragrances & Remugles (1991)
L'intégrale Saison 1 1979-1983 (2007)
L'intégrale Saison 2 1984-... (2008)

Solo
Ratatouille (single, 1985)

Other works

Filmography
 (1989)
 (1991)
Cut (1992)
Les Carnassiers (1993)
 (1996)

References

1948 births
2021 deaths
People from Boulogne-Billancourt
French humorists
French musicians